Vikash Yadav (born 3 February 1988) is an Indian cricketer. He made his List A debut on 16 October 2019, for Bihar in the 2019–20 Vijay Hazare Trophy.

References

External links
 

1988 births
Living people
Indian cricketers
Bihar cricketers
Place of birth missing (living people)